is a station on the Tama Toshi Monorail Line in Tachikawa, Tokyo, Japan.

Lines
Tachikawa-Minami Station is a station on the Tama Toshi Monorail Line and is located 5.8 kilometers from the terminus of the line at Kamikitadai Station.

Station layout
Tachikawa-Minami Station is a raised station with two tracks and two opposed side platforms, with the station building located underneath. It is a standardized station building for this monorail line.

Platforms

History
The station opened on 10 January 2000.

Station numbering was introduced in February 2018 with Tachikawa-Minami being assigned TT11.

Surrounding area
The station is above Tokyo Metropolitan Route 149 south of JR Tachikawa Station. Both stations (and Tachikawa-Kita Station) are connected via a pedestrian walkway.
Other points of interest include:
 Granduo (Tachikawa Station Building)
 AREAREA (shopping center)
 Tokyo Metropolitan Tama Cultural Center and Library

References

External links

 Tama Monorail Tachikawa-Minami Station 

Railway stations in Japan opened in 2000
Railway stations in Tokyo
Tama Toshi Monorail
Tachikawa, Tokyo